Fräulein Lilli or Miss Lilli is a 1936 Austrian comedy film directed by Hans Behrendt, Robert Wohlmuth and Max Neufeld. It starred Franciska Gaal, Hans Jaray and S.Z. Sakall. It was Gaal's last European film, although she did briefly start work in 1946 on Renee XIV, before it was abandoned during filming.

Cast
 Franciska Gaal as Fräulein Lilli 
 Hans Jaray as Fredy Scott 
 S.Z. Sakall as Prokurist Seidl
 Karl Ehmann as Juwelier Höfer 
 Richard Eybner as Van Eyben 
 Karl Paryla as Jonny 
 Darío Medina
 Anny Burg
 Benno Smytt 
 Viktor Franz 
 Wilhelm Schich 
 Grit von Elben

References

Bibliography 
 Hans-Michael Bock and Tim Bergfelder. The Concise Cinegraph: An Encyclopedia of German Cinema. Berghahn Books.
 Dassanowsky, Robert. Austrian Cinema: A History. McFarland & Company Incorporated Pub, 2005.

External links 
 

1936 films
1936 comedy films
Austrian comedy films
1930s German-language films
Films directed by Max Neufeld
Films directed by Hans Behrendt
Films directed by Robert Wohlmuth
Films set in Monaco
Universal Pictures films
Austrian black-and-white films
Films scored by Hans J. Salter